The inland rainforest, also known as the inland temperate rainforest in the classification system of the WWF, is a temperate rainforest in the Central Interior of British Columbia. It is part of the Interior Cedar Hemlock (ICH) zone of the biogeoclimatic zones system developed by the BC Ministry of Forests, in the Rocky Mountain Trench. The oldest and most diverse parts of the forest are typically found on northeasterly aspect wet toe slopes, with Western Red Cedar (Thuja plicata) trees over 1,000 years old and undisturbed forest stands much older than that. Some of these toe-slope benches were cleared in the 1960s to develop the Yellowhead Highway, with the added result that most of the remainder became easily accessible to industrial logging and recreation, and more recently to research and interpretation. As a consequence there are only a handful of the best sites left undisturbed in 2008.

In 1987, a science-based conservation group Save-The-Cedar League was formed. With the establishment of the new University of Northern British Columbia (UNBC) in Prince George the 1990s, further research continued to highlight the significance of the ICH zone east of the city.  The arrival of a defoliating insect outbreak, the Hemlock Looper, Lambdina fiscellaria fiscellaria, resulted in increased salvage logging of old cedar stands along the Yellowhead Highway. This was reduced by the province's chief forester in the early 2000s as the appreciation of non-timber values of the zone began to be realized and as the Mountain Pine Beetle catastrophe spread across the Interior Plateau to the west and large-scale salvage logging moved in that direction.

As the Mountain Pine Beetle wave passes, attention is returning to the mountain wet zones. Some of this came to a head in 2006 with the development of an old growth forest trail by the nearby small community of Dome Creek in the richest site yet found, a place that was also scheduled to be logged. The resulting socio-economic and ecological issues were investigated in a documentary film, Block 486.

Climate change effects
The Interior Cedar Hemlock (ICH) zone is of particular significance with respect to climate change. Climatic warming projections suggest that by mid-century or soon afterwards, this location may be at the southerly extent of the ICH. The ICH zone will also have spread throughout much of the Prince George area and farther north. The Rocky Mountain Trench east of Prince George therefore offers the last best chance to preserve some of the rare 'Tier-1' ICH sites.

References

Contribution of non-vascular plants such as lichens and mosses to ecosystem function along elevational gradients in Western Canada
Dome Creek Ancient Forest website 
Documentary film, Block 486 - Narrative
North American Moose Conference (2007)

Forests of the Rocky Mountains
Temperate coniferous forests
Temperate rainforests
Forests of British Columbia
Central Interior of British Columbia
Nature conservation in Canada